Yeni Alat is a village in the municipality of Alat in the Garadagh raion of Baku, Azerbaijan.

References

Populated places in Baku